Lagkadikia (Greek:) is a village located in the regional unit of Thessaloniki, in Greece, north-east of Mount Chortiatis. It has facilities such as "Langadikia High School" (Gymnasium-Lyceum) and "Agronomy Department" that are used by many surrounding villages, as it is located on a cross-road between Lake Koroneia and Lake Volvi.
The village has about 800 permanent inhabitants. It is part of the municipal unit of Koroneia, which contains also the villages Agios Vasileios, Gerakarou, Vasiloudi, and Ardameri.

Location 
Langadikia is located 36 km east from Thessaloniki and at the only road that connects the old National road to the Egnatia motorway. Visitors have three choices in order to reach the village:
Through the Egnatia motorway
Through the old national road Thessaloniki-Kavala
Through Panorama-Hortiatis

External links
Municipality of Koroneia

Populated places in Thessaloniki (regional unit)